Dubovoye is a rural locality (a selo) and the administrative center of Dubovskoye Rural Settlement, Yelansky District, Volgograd Oblast, Russia. The population was 819 as of 2010. There are 15 streets.

Geography 
Dubovoye is located 10 km northwest of Yelan (the district's administrative centre) by road. Volkovo is the nearest rural locality.

References 

Rural localities in Yelansky District